Sesamoides is a genus of flowering plants belonging to the family Resedaceae.

Its native range is Europe and Africa.

Species
Species:

Sesamoides clusii 
Sesamoides interrupta 
Sesamoides minor 
Sesamoides prostrata 
Sesamoides purpurascens 
Sesamoides spathulifolia 
Sesamoides suffruticosa

References

Resedaceae
Brassicales genera